The 1965–66 season was the 64th season in which Dundee competed at a Scottish national level, playing in Division One, where the club would finish in 9th place. Domestically, Dundee would also compete in both the Scottish League Cup and the Scottish Cup, where they would be knocked out in the group stages of the League Cup, and by Celtic in the 2nd round of the Scottish Cup.

Scottish Division One 

Statistics provided by Dee Archive.

League table

Scottish League Cup 

Statistics provided by Dee Archive.

Group 1

Group 1 table

Scottish Cup 

Statistics provided by Dee Archive.

Player statistics 
Statistics provided by Dee Archive

|}

See also 

 List of Dundee F.C. seasons

References

External links 

 1965-66 Dundee season on Fitbastats

Dundee F.C. seasons
Dundee